Brett Battles is an American author from Los Angeles, California.

Publishing History
Brett Battles' first novel, The Cleaner (2007), introduced recurring character Jonathan Quinn, freelance intelligence operative. "The Cleaner" was nominated for the Barry Award for Best Thriller.

His second novel, The Deceived (2008), won the Barry Award for Best Thriller.

His third novel, Shadow of Betrayal, continues the adventures of freelance operative and "cleaner" Jonathan Quinn. Shadow of Betrayal was published in the United Kingdom under the title The Unwanted (Preface Publishing, 2009).

This fourth novel, The Silenced, was released by Dell in 2011.

Bibliography

Jonathan Quinn Series

Note: In the US, The Unwanted was sold under the title Shadow of Betrayal.

Logan Harper Thrillers

Project Eden Thrillers

Rewinder Series

Night Man Chronicles

Stand-Alone Novels

Short Stories
 2008 – "Perfect Gentleman" (published in Killer Year edited by Lee Child – St. Martin's Press)
 2011 – "Just Another Job – A Jonathan Quinn Story" (published by Slam Bang Stories, Available on Amazon Kindle)
 2011 – "Off the Clock A Jonathan Quinn Story" – May 20, 2011

Novella
July 10, 2011– Becoming Quinn (A Jonathan Quinn Novel): A prequel to the series

See also 
 Rewinder

References

External links
 Brett Battles' Official Web Site

21st-century American novelists
American crime fiction writers
American male novelists
Barry Award winners
Living people
People from Ridgecrest, California
21st-century American male writers
Novelists from California
Year of birth missing (living people)